was a Japanese figure skater. He competed in the men's singles event at the 1936 Winter Olympics.

References

1914 births
Year of death missing
Japanese male single skaters
Olympic figure skaters of Japan
Figure skaters at the 1936 Winter Olympics
Sportspeople from Tokyo